Call Me Lucky is a 2015 American documentary film directed by Bobcat Goldthwait about the life of satirist, author, and performer Barry Crimmins.

Synopsis
Call Me Lucky details the life of stand-up comedian and activist Barry Crimmins, from his roots in upstate New York to his work as a political satirist and advocate.

Production 
Filming began in January 2014 in Boston and Crimmins' home in upstate New York. Principal photography wrapped in August 2014.

Reception
The film premiered on January 7, 2015 at the Sundance Film Festival in the Documentary Competition program. It went on to play over a dozen festivals around the US and was released theatrically on August 7, 2015.

Review aggregator Rotten Tomatoes reports that 85% of 26 film critics have given the film a positive review, with a rating average of 7.6 out of 10.

AV Club critic Mike D'Angelo wrote "If it accomplishes nothing else, the new documentary Call Me Lucky should bring some welcome attention to a man who's been under the radar for the past few decades, mostly by his own design." Stephen Holden of the New York Times wrote "An earnest homage that also honors Mr. Crimmins's crusade to drive child pornography off the Internet."

References

External links

2015 documentary films
2015 films
American documentary films
Documentary films about comedy and comedians
2010s English-language films
Films directed by Bobcat Goldthwait
2010s American films